Keturah Lydia Kamugasa (died December 20, 2017) was a Ugandan writer and journalist most notable for her weekly column in The New Vision daily, called "Style with Keturah Kamugasa". She was also the editor of Flair magazine, New Vision's Bride and Groom  (source flair magazine April 2008 and April 2008 for bride and groom magazine). She died on December 20, 2017 at the age of 50.

References

1960s births
2017 deaths
Year of birth missing
Ugandan journalists
Ugandan women writers